The 1990-91 Cup of Yugoslavia  was the penultimate season of SFR Yugoslavia's football knockout competition. It was the last season that the cup was also known as the Marshal Tito Cup. It was also the last season in which Croatian and Slovenian teams participated, as the two countries seceded from Yugoslavia in 1991. Croatia's Hajduk Split beat Crvena Zvezda 1-0 to win the cup.

As Croatia seceded from Yugoslavia, Hajduk's Igor Štimac said, "This trophy will forever stay with us, because I believe that the Cup of Yugoslavia will never be played again." The trophy was never returned to the Football Association of Yugoslavia.

First round
In the following tables winning teams are marked in bold; teams from outside top level are marked in italic script.

Second round

Quarter-finals

Semi-finals

Final

See also
1990–91 Yugoslav First League
1990–91 Yugoslav Second League

References

External links
1990–91 cup season details at Rec.Sport.Soccer Statistics Foundation
1991 cup final details at Rec.Sport.Soccer Statistics Foundation

 

Yugoslav Cup seasons
Cup
Yugo